Ross Warneke (5 April 1952 – 25 August 2006) was an Australian journalist, broadcaster, and television commentator in Melbourne.

Career 
Ross Warneke often acted as a substitute on Neil Mitchell's morning program on radio station 3AW. He was at the helm of the show for many big news stories, including the Port Arthur massacre and the 9/11 terrorist attack on America.

For many years Warneke wrote a column in The Age's television guide, Green Guide, mainly focusing on the discussion of television ratings and other television matters of the previous week.

Death
On 24 August 2006, it was announced in Green Guide that Warneke was gravely ill and suffering from cancer. In less than 24 hours, on 25 August 2006, Warneke died in a Melbourne hospital with his wife and son at his bedside.

References

1952 births
2006 deaths
3AW presenters
Deaths from cancer in Victoria (Australia)
Journalists from Melbourne